The 1931 Iowa State Cyclones football team represented Iowa State College of Agricultural and Mechanic Arts (later renamed Iowa State University) in the Big Six Conference during the 1931 college football season. In their first season under head coach George F. Veenker, the Cyclones compiled a 5–3 record (3–1 against conference opponents), finished in second place in the conference, and were outscored by opponents by a combined total of 74 to 72. They played their home games at State Field in Ames, Iowa.

Robert Bowmen was the team captain. Roger Bowen and Dick Grefe were selected as first-team all-conference players.

Schedule

References

Iowa State
Iowa State Cyclones football seasons
Iowa State Cyclones football